Catherine Cobham is a scholar and translator of Arabic literature.

Biography
She obtained a BA from Leeds University and an MA from Manchester University and presently teaches at the University of St Andrews.

She has translated numerous literary works from Arabic to English, including several by the Lebanese author Hanan al-Shaykh.
 Adunis - An Introduction to Arab Poetics
 Fuad al-Takarli - The Long Way Back 
 Hanan al-Shaykh - Beirut Blues
 Hanan al-Shaykh - I Sweep the Sun Off Rooftops 
 Hanan al-Shaykh - Only in London 
 Hanan al-Shaykh - Women of Sand and Myrrh
 Hasan Abdallah al-Qurashi - Spectres of Exile and Other Poems (co-translator: John Heath-Stubbs)
 Mahmoud Darwish - A River Dies of Thirst 
 Naguib Mahfouz - The Harafish 
 Nawal El Saadawi - Memoirs of a Woman Doctor
 Yusuf Idris - Rings of Burnished Brass
 A Reader of Modern Arabic Short Stories (co-editor with Sabry Hafez)
 Jasmine, Lady of the Arabs (editor; Safaya Salter, illustrator)
 The Iraqi Novel: Key Writers, Key Texts, Edinburgh Studies in Modern Arabic Literature, 2013 (with Fabio Caiani), Edinburgh University Press, 264 pages - "Followers of Arabic literature have long been awaiting the critical acclaim recently afforded to Iraqi fiction. ... This interest makes ... The Iraqi Novel a particular timely contribution that will provide English-language readers further exposure to Iraqi literature."

See also
 List of Arabic-English translators

References

Arabic–English translators
Translators from Arabic
British women academics
Year of birth missing (living people)
Living people
Alumni of the University of Leeds
Alumni of the University of Manchester